Barclay Tagg (born December 30, 1937, in Lancaster, Pennsylvania) is an American thoroughbred horse trainer. A 1961 graduate of Pennsylvania State University with a degree in Animal Husbandry. Barclay is best known for conditioning Kentucky Derby, Preakness Stakes, and Jockey Club Gold Cup winner Funny Cide. Horses in Tagg's stable have included Tiz the Law, Showing Up and Nobiz Like Shobiz. Barclay trains horses year round, spending spring in New York and winter in Florida.

Formerly a steeplechase jockey, Tagg won his first race in 1972 at Old Liberty Park. He has been a journeyman trainer for many years, and with Funny Cide became the first trainer to win the Kentucky Derby in his first attempt since Cam Gambolati with Spend a Buck in 1985. He won the 2020 Belmont Stakes with New York-bred Tiz the Law

References

External links
 BarclayTaggRacing.com

1937 births
Living people
Penn State College of Agricultural Sciences alumni
American horse trainers
Sportspeople from Lancaster, Pennsylvania